Arab al-'Arida, is a depopulated former Palestinian Arab village and   south of the city of Beit She'an.

History
It stood on the Tell al-Ru'yan and Tell al-Qurud sites.

British Mandate era
In the 1931 census it had a population of 182, all  Muslims,  in  a total of 38  houses.

In the 1945 statistics it had a population of 150 Muslims and held 700 dunams of land. In 1944/45 a total of 600 dunums of village land  was used for cereals, while 100 dunams were classed as uncultivable.

1948 and aftermath
It was captured by Israel's Golani Brigade during Operation Gideon on May 20, 1948. Following the war the area was incorporated into the State of Israel. The Palestinian historian Walid Khalidi, described the village remains in 1992: "No traces are left of the village. The whole village site is planted in wheat. The archaeological site, Tall al-Ru'yan, has been transformed into a garbage dump."

See also
 Depopulated Palestinian locations in Israel

References

Bibliography

External links
Welcome To 'Arab al-'Arida
 'Arab al-'Arida, Zochrot
Survey of Western Palestine Map 9:    IAA, Wikimedia commons
'Arab al-Arida from Khalil Sakakini Cultural Centre

Arab villages depopulated during the 1948 Arab–Israeli War
District of Baysan